Temporary Lieutenant John Godwin, RNVR (13 December 1919 – 2 February 1945) was a British naval officer. Born and brought up in Argentina, he took part in a raid named Operation Checkmate on Axis shipping near Haugesund, north of Stavanger, Norway. His party managed to sink a minesweeper and a number of steamers  using limpet mines, but he was eventually captured with the rest of his party, a commando sergeant, two Naval Petty Officers and three seamen. Initially they were held in Grini concentration camp. This was the same camp where, in January 1943, the Germans executed five commando survivors of Operation Freshman. However, Godwin and his comrades were not executed at Grini, but instead sent to Sachsenhausen concentration camp, where contrary to the Geneva Convention, they were forced to march 30 miles a day on cobbles testing army boots.

On 2 February 1945 they were led to execution, in accordance with Hitler's Commando Order of 1942. Godwin managed to wrestle the pistol of the firing party commander from his belt and shoot him dead before being himself shot. No superior officer witnessed this act so a decoration could not be awarded.  However, his bravery was mentioned in dispatches (posthumously). The citation, in The London Gazette, 9 October 1945, read: "For great gallantry and inspiring example whilst a prisoner of war in German hands in Norway and afterwards at Sachsenhausen, near Oranienburg, Germany, 1942–1945".

Notes

Sources
 Volunteers from Argentina who gave their lives in WWII. Memorial
 CWGC entry
 M. R. D. Foot & J. M. Langley 1979 MI9 – Escape and Evasion 1939–1945, London, Book Club Associates, London, 1979 pp. 154, 155 
 
 

1945 deaths
Royal Navy officers
People from Buenos Aires
People executed by Germany by firearm
Royal Naval Volunteer Reserve personnel of World War II
Royal Navy personnel killed in World War II
Argentina in World War II
Military personnel who died in Nazi concentration camps
Argentine people of English descent
Grini concentration camp prisoners
People who died in Sachsenhausen concentration camp
Royal Navy Commando officers
1919 births
Executed Argentine people
British people executed in Nazi concentration camps
Argentine people executed in Nazi concentration camps
Argentine prisoners of war
Royal Navy officers of World War II